The 2016 Southern Steel season saw the Southern Steel netball team compete in the 2016 ANZ Championship. With a team coached by Noeline Taurua, captained by Wendy Frew and featuring Jhaniele Fowler-Reid, Steel finished the season as minor premiers.

Players

Player movements

2016 roster

Regular season

Fixtures and results
Round 1

 
Round 2

Round 3

 
Round 4

Round 5

Round 6

Round 7
 received a bye.
Round 8

Round 9

Round 10
 
 
Round 11

 
Round 12

Round 13

Round 14

Final standings

Finals series

New Zealand Conference Final

Semi-finals

Award winners

ANZ Championship awards

New Zealand Netball Awards

National Netball League
With a team captained by Hayley Crofts, Steel's reserve team, Netball South won the inaugural National Netball League title after defeating Central Zone 51–46 in the grand final at The Trusts Arena. At the 2016 New Zealand Netball Awards, Netball South winning the inaugural title was named Moment of the Year and head coach, Lauren Piebenga, was named National Coach of the Year.

References

2016
2016 ANZ Championship season
2016 in New Zealand netball